Meltdown is an annual festival held in London, featuring a mix of music, art, performance and film. Meltdown is held in June at Southbank Centre, the arts complex covering  and including the Royal Festival Hall, the Queen Elizabeth Hall and The Hayward. Each year, the festival chooses an established music artist or act as director of the event, and they pick the performers of their choosing. Previous Meltdown directors have included Elvis Costello, David Bowie, Patti Smith, Lee Scratch Perry, Morrissey, Jarvis Cocker, Nick Cave, Scott Walker, John Peel and Ornette Coleman. The festival has been held annually since 1993, except in 2006 when the Royal Festival Hall was closed for refurbishment. On November 6, 2019, Grace Jones was announced as the curator of the 2020 Meltdown, but due to the COVID-19 pandemic, this has since been rescheduled to 2022.

Previous line-ups

References

External links

Meltdown page at the official Southbank Centre site

Music festivals in London
Performance art festivals
Annual events in London